"Avalanche" is a song by Leonard Cohen. It appears on his third album, Songs of Love and Hate, released in 1971.

The lyrics are based on a poem he had previously written. He acknowledged in a 1992 interview with Paul Zollo that his "chop", his unique pattern of playing classical guitar, is behind many of his early songs, and this one features Cohen's trademark fast, syncopated classical guitar pattern as the accompaniment on the recording of the song.

Cover versions 

 Nick Cave & the Bad Seeds recorded a version of the song for their 1984 album, From Her to Eternity. In 2015, as a solo artist, Nick Cave covered "Avalanche" again for season 2 of Black Sails.
 Aimee Mann recorded the song as opening theme for the TV series I'll Be Gone in the Dark (2020).
 Ghost recorded a version of the song for their 2018 album, Prequelle

References

1971 songs
Columbia Records singles
Leonard Cohen songs
Nick Cave songs
Song recordings produced by Bob Johnston
Song recordings produced by Flood (producer)
Songs written by Leonard Cohen